Dudley Port railway station serves the Dudley Port and Great Bridge areas of Tipton, West Midlands, England, Situated on the Stour Valley Line, the station is operated by West Midlands Railway.

Upper Level station

History

The station opened in 1852. The line had passenger usage until about the early 1880s, when it began to slump at several stations, leading to the line becoming a largely freight only operation in 1887. It would remain open for goods traffic, which was considerable at this time, as the district had become highly industrialised in the then heyday of the Black Country's industrial past.

As the local industry declined and road transport became more common, the station entered a post-World War II decline.

The name Dudley Port emerged during the 19th century, due to the extensive number of warehouses and wharves emerging around the Birmingham Canal to serve industries in Dudley. The area initially became known as Dudley's Port, before the title Dudley Port was adopted.

Dudley Port Station was originally known as Dudley Port High Level Station, as a Low Level Station was situated on the South Staffordshire line from Dudley to Walsall, which passes beneath.

High Level was dropped from the station's name when the Low Level station closed in 1964 as a result of the Beeching Axe.

The upper level was revamped in the mid-1980s and officially re-opened by West Midlands County councillor Gordon Morgan in 1989.

Today's usage

Services 
Dudley Port is served by West Midlands Railway services between Walsall and Wolverhampton, under a franchise agreement with the Department for Transport.

During Monday–Saturday daytime, there is a train every half hour, which calls at all stations between Wolverhampton and Walsall via Birmingham New Street. On Sundays, there is typically one train per hour between Birmingham and Wolverhampton only.

Three main West Midlands Railway express services call at this station - the first is a morning peak service from Stafford to New Street, the second evening peak service from Birmingham New Street to Shrewsbury and the third is the final service from Birmingham New Street to Crewe.

Low Level station

History
There was a Low Level Station on the former South Staffordshire Line that had opened in 1850, which provided a rail connection from Dudley Port to Dudley railway station. The line had reasonable passenger usage until about the early 1880s, when it began to slump at several stations, leading to the line becoming a largely freight only operation in 1887. It would remain open for goods traffic, which was considerable at this time, as the district had become highly industrialised in the then heyday of the Black Country's industrial past. It closed in June 1964 as passenger services were phased out along the line due to the Beeching Axe and the blue brick station building was demolished three years later, although the railway remained open to goods trains until 1993.

Just to the north of Dudley Port Low Level was the junction for the connecting line to the GWR Snow Hill Line via Great Bridge. To the south was the junction for the short connecting line to the Stour Valley Line.

West Midlands Metro
Phase Two of the West Midlands Metro is seeing the line reopening between Walsall, Dudley Port railway station, Dudley railway station and the Merry Hill Shopping Centre for trams. The closed section of the South Staffordshire Line through Dudley is under construction due to re-open in 2022–2023, as a  Midland Metro tramway. 
The lower level would open as a West Midlands Metro stop.

Reopening
The Midland Metro is set to be extended from Wednesbury to Brierley Hill, with goods trains running alongside it, with the former South Staffordshire Line being reopened for this use by 2023. A new Midland Metro stop is set to be open on the site of the former Dudley Port Low Level Station. Due to cost issues, it was announced in July 2022 that the Metro will be built in two phases with the section to Dudley opening first with the extension to Brierley Hill and Merry Hill dependent on additional funding.

References

External links 

Rail Around Birmingham and the West Midlands: Dudley Port station
Some South Staffordshire Railway Byways – The Darlaston Branch
A History of Wednesbury
Dudley Port Low Level Station

 

Tipton
Disused railway stations in Sandwell 
Railway stations in Sandwell 
Former London and North Western Railway stations
DfT Category E stations
Railway stations in Great Britain opened in 1850 
Railway stations in Great Britain closed in 1964 
Railway stations in Great Britain opened in 1852 
Railway stations served by West Midlands Trains
1852 establishments in England